Yunost (Youth) is a Russian language literary magazine created in 1955 in Moscow (initially as a USSR Union of Writers' organ) by Valentin Kataev, its first editor-in-chief, who was fired in 1961 for publishing Vasily Aksyonov's Ticket to the Stars. In Yunost, which appealed to the young intellectual readership and contained an impressive poetry section, were premiered some significant, occasionally controversial (from the Soviet censorship's point of view) works of Anna Akhmatova, Bella Akhmadulina, Bulat Okudzhava, Nikolay Rubtsov, Yevgeny Yevtushenko, Andrey Voznesensky, Robert Rozhdestvensky, Boris Vasilyev, Andrei Molchanov, Rimma Kazakova, Mikhail Zadornov, Fazil Iskander, Vasily Aksyonov, Anatoly Gladilin, Anatoly Kuznetsov, Grigory Gorin, Nikolay Leonov and others. Since 1991 Yunost is an independently published journal.

Editors-in-chief
 1955—1961 Valentin Katayev
 1961—1981 Boris Polevoy 
 1981—1992 Andrey Dementyev
 1992—2007 Victor Lipatov
 2007— Valery Dudarev

References

External links 
 Yunost official site
 Archive 1961-1990 

1955 establishments in Russia
Magazines established in 1955
Magazines published in Moscow
Literary magazines published in Russia
Russian-language magazines
Literary magazines published in the Soviet Union